Cotto may refer to:

 Cotto (name), a surname common amongst those of Spanish, Portuguese, Italian, French or Sephardic Jewish ancestry
 Cotto (material), a type of Italian brick tile
 Cotto salami, a cooked variety of salami
 Cotto Laurel, a barriada in Ponce, Puerto Rico

See also

 Coto (disambiguation)
 Crudo (disambiguation)